Liberty Party may refer to:
Liberty Party (United States) 
Liberty Party (United States, 1840)
Liberty Party (United States, 1932)
Liberty (Poland)
Liberty Party (Liberia)
Liberty Party (Turkey) a historical party in Turkey
Liberty Korea Party

See also
 Liberal Party
 Libertarian Party (disambiguation)
 Freedom Party (disambiguation)